There are 42 Church of England dioceses, each being an administrative territorial unit governed by a bishop. These cover England, the Isle of Man, the Channel Islands and a small part of Wales. The Diocese in Europe is also a part of the Church of England, and covers the whole of continental Europe, Morocco and the post-Soviet states. The structure of dioceses within the Church of England was initially inherited from the Catholic Church as part of the Protestant Reformation. During the Reformation a number of new dioceses were founded, but no more were then created until the middle of the 19th century, when dioceses were founded mainly in response to the growing population, especially in the northern industrial cities. The most recent diocese to be established was the Diocese of Leeds, which came into being on 20 April 2014. Prior to that, no new dioceses had been created since 1927. Leeds was created by combining three previous dioceses: the Diocese of Bradford, the  Diocese of Ripon and Leeds, and the Diocese of Wakefield.

The 42 current dioceses are divided into two provinces. The Province of Canterbury in the south comprises 30 dioceses and the Province of York in the north comprises 12. The archbishops of Canterbury and York have pastoral oversight over the bishops within their province, along with certain other rights and responsibilities. All of the dioceses have one cathedral each except the Diocese of Leeds, which has three that are considered co-equal. Of all the dioceses, Derby has the smallest cathedral; Derby Cathedral takes up only . One diocese dates back to the 6th century, eight date back to the 7th century, two to the 10th century, five to the 11th century, two to the 12th century, five to the 16th century, seven to the 19th century, and ten to the 20th century. The territories administered by the various dioceses generally accord with the counties as they existed before the Local Government Act 1972.

Dioceses

Former dioceses

Statistics 
Source: Diocese of Europe excluded.

1persons per square mile

See also 

 
 Historical development of Church of England dioceses
 List of Anglican dioceses in the United Kingdom and Ireland
 List of cathedrals in the United Kingdom
 Armorial of the Church of England

Notes

Bibliography 

 
England geography-related lists
Dioceses
England